is a former Japanese football player and manager. He currently manager of Tegevajaro Miyazaki.

Club career
Matsuda was born in Nagasaki on September 2, 1960. After graduating from University of Tsukuba, he joined Japan Soccer League club Mazda (later Sanfrecce Hiroshima) in 1984. He became a regular player as center back with Katsuyoshi Shinto. The club won the 2nd place 1987 Emperor's Cup. In 1992, Japan Soccer League was folded and founded new league J1 League. In 1994, although the club won the 2nd place J1 League, his opportunity to play decreased. In 1995, he moved to Japan Football League club Vissel Kobe. In 1996, the club won the 2nd place and was promoted to J1 League. However he retired end of 1996 season without playing in J1 at the club.

Managerial career
After retirement, Matsuda started coaching career at Vissel Kobe in 1997. He mainly served as coach until 2002. In July 2002, the club results were bad and manager Ryoichi Kawakatsu was sacked. Matsuda became a new manager as Kawakatsu successor. He stayed the club in J1 League and left the club end of 2002 season. In 2003, he moved to J2 League club Avispa Fukuoka. The club won the 2nd place in 2005 and was promoted to J1. However the club results were bad in 2006 and he was sacked in May. In August 2006, he returned to J2 club Vissel and became a coach under manager Stuart Baxter. However Baxter left the club for family matters in September, Matsuda became a new manager as Baxter successor. In 2006 season, the club won the 3rd place and was promoted to J1. He managed the club until 2008. In 2009, he moved to newly was promoted to J2 League club, Tochigi SC. Although the club results were bad in first season, the club finished at middle place from 2010 to 2012. However the club results were bad in 2013, he was sacked in September.

In 4 May 2021, he joined as manager J2 club, V-Varen Nagasaki to 12 June 2022 after resignation. In 17 August 2022, Matsuda appointment of J1 club, Gamba Osaka until end of season. 

On 7 December 2022, Matsuda appointment manager of J3 club, Tegevajaro Miyazaki from upcoming season for 2023 replace Yasushi Takasaki after contract expiration end of 2022 season.

Club statistics

Managerial statistics

References

External links
 
 

1960 births
Living people
University of Tsukuba alumni
Association football people from Nagasaki Prefecture
Japanese footballers
Japan Soccer League players
J1 League players
Japan Football League (1992–1998) players
Sanfrecce Hiroshima players
Vissel Kobe players
Japanese football managers
J1 League managers
J2 League managers
J3 League managers
Vissel Kobe managers
Avispa Fukuoka managers
Tochigi SC managers
V-Varen Nagasaki managers
Gamba Osaka managers
Tegevajaro Miyazaki managers
Association football defenders